Incident on a Dark Street is a 1973 TV movie broadcast on NBC Saturday Night at the Movies. It premiered on NBC on January 13, 1973.

Plot
Two law school grads take on their first big cases as prosecutors for the federal government as U.S. Attorney Joe Dubbs is attempting to bring down the crime boss Dominic Leopold. A corrupt city utilities commissioner promises Leopold the contract for a massive public works project in return for a huge kickback. A small-time hood is murdered just as he is about to blow the whistle on the organized crime ring and expose the scheme to defraud the city.

Cast
 James Olson as Joe Dubbs
 David Canary as Peter Gallagher
 Robert Pine as Paul Hamilton Jr.
 Richard S. Castellano as Frank Romeo
 William Shatner as Deaver G. Wallace
 Murray Hamilton as Edmund Schilling
 Gilbert Roland as Dominic Leopold
 David Doyle as Luke Burgess
 James Davidson as Arthur Lloyd Trenier
 Kathleen Lloyd as Louise Trenier
 John Kerr as Gallagher (Trenier's Lawyer)
 Marlene Clark as Rose
 Jerome Thor as Abe Hirsch
 Valentin de Vargas as Ernesto De La Pina
 Susan Stafford as Monica Forbes
 Tony Giorgio as Vincent Romeo
 Jay W. MacIntosh as Court Clerk
 Marian Collier as Miss Gentry
 Jennifer Kulik as Anne
 Wesley Lau as John Pine
 Roland La Starza as "Sonny"
 Earl Eby as Judge
 Nickolas Konakas as Young Detective
 Michael W. Stokey as Teenage Boy
 Michele Nichols as Teenage Girl
 Owen Orr as Square Built Man
 Jed Allan as Ben Maddon
 Robyn Millan as Marnie Jaycox
 Don "Red" Barry as Miles Henderson
 Gordon Pinsent as Mayor Joe
 Mark Jenkins
 Eddie Quillan as Security Guard
 James A. Watson Jr. as Niles McKeon

Production
The television film was produced by 20th Century Fox Television as a pilot for the proposed series The Prosecutors starring James Olson and David Canary but it was not picked up for a series.

Reception
Maitland McDonagh of TV Guide gave the film 2 out of 5 stars, noting that it has "all the earmarks of a pilot for a series" but that it is "talky and slow-moving".

References

External links

1973 television films
1973 films
Films about corruption in the United States
Films about lawyers
Films about organized crime in the United States
Films directed by Buzz Kulik
Films scored by Elmer Bernstein
NBC network original films
NBC Saturday Night at the Movies
American crime drama films
Procedural films
Television pilots not picked up as a series
American drama television films
1970s American films